Anton Makarenko (born 22 August 1988) is a Ukrainian footballer who plays as a midfielder for Landesliga Bayern club TSV Neudrossenfeld. He is also assistant coach of the club.

Career 
Makarenko began his career with SV Kauerhof and joined later the youth team from 1. FC Nürnberg. He remained there until 2006 when he signed his first professional contract with FC Augsburg.

On 23 January 2009, he moved on loan to SSV Reutlingen on a six-month deal. The move was then made permanent.

Makarenko joined SV Babelsberg 03 in June 2010, who had recently won promotion to the 3. Liga. He managed to stay up in the third division in the following two years with the club, scoring 13 goals in 68 appearances. He moved to league rivals Chemnitzer FC in May 2012, where he signed a two-year contract.

Ahead of the 2014–15 season, he moved to Energie Cottbus. One season later, he joined SpVgg Bayreuth in the Regionalliga Bayern, where he spent the following seven years. After helping the team to the title in the 2021–22 season and promotion to the 3. Liga, Makarenko retired from professional football and joined Landesliga Bayern club TSV Neudrossenfeld as a playing assistant-coach.

References

External links
 

1988 births
Living people
Footballers from Kharkiv
Ukrainian footballers
Ukraine under-21 international footballers
1. FC Nürnberg players
SV Babelsberg 03 players
FC Augsburg players
SSV Reutlingen 05 players
Chemnitzer FC players
FC Energie Cottbus players
SpVgg Bayreuth players
2. Bundesliga players
3. Liga players
Regionalliga players
Landesliga players
Ukrainian expatriate footballers
Expatriate footballers in Germany
Ukrainian expatriate sportspeople in Germany
Association football midfielders
Association football coaches